

British European Airways Flight 142 (callsign Beeline 142) was a scheduled service between London Heathrow Airport and Naples Airport. On 22 October 1958, it was flown by a Vickers Viscount 701, registered G-ANHC, and named "Sir Leopold McClintock". During its flight, the Viscount collided with an Italian Air Force North American F-86E Sabre over Anzio, Italy.

Accident
Flight 142 was flying at 23,500 feet towards Naples when it collided with the F-86E. The F-86E was the leading aircraft of four on a tactical training exercise when it hit the Viscount. Both aircraft crashed, with the loss of all souls on the Viscount. The F-86 pilot, Captain Giovanni Savorelli, didn't use his ejector but parachuted down successfully and spent 6 months in hospital.

Investigation
While no blame was assigned for the accident, it was noted that the Viscount had strayed out of its airway and into a military-prohibited area.

References

External links
  (includes description and video of aftermath including fuselage and burial ceremony)
 
 

Aviation accidents and incidents in 1958
Aviation accidents and incidents in Italy
Accidents and incidents involving the Vickers Viscount
Mid-air collisions
Mid-air collisions involving airliners
Mid-air collisions involving military aircraft
Flight 142
1958 in Italy
October 1958 events in Europe